Abu Desmond Mansaray (born 25 September 1984 in Sierra Leone) is a footballer from Sierra Leone who plays for Club Zefrol in the Maldives. He is described as good at dribbling and crossing into the box.

Career

Following a 3–2 defeat to Indonesian team Arema Malang in the 2014 AFC Cup, Mansaray encapsulated his side's performance in two sentences by saying that they tried hard and lost because they were not lucky enough.

Won the 2017 edition of the Maldives Second Division with Club Zefrol, scoring a goal in the final.

During his stay with VB Sports, the striker put in a string of solid performances for the club, including a hat-trick in a 6–3 victory over Club Eagles in 2012.

References

External links 

 at Footballdatabase.eu
 at Soccerway

Sierra Leone international footballers
Association football forwards
Living people
Sierra Leonean footballers
Expatriate footballers in the Maldives
1984 births
Sierra Leonean expatriate footballers
Club Eagles players